Catoferia is a small genus of plants in the family Lamiaceae composed of only four different species. First described in full by George Bentham in 1876, said species are native to southern Mexico, Central America, Colombia and Peru. Amongst all four species, only Catoferia chiapensis are known to grow across a wide area, their growth recorded in southern Mexico, Guatemala, Peru and Belize. Growth of the other three variants is believed to be limited to Southern Mexico. The beginning of the genus Catoeria is thought trace back to the Cretaceous era, making it around 55 to 65 million years old.

 Catoferia capitata (Benth.) Hemsl. - Veracruz, Oaxaca, Chiapas, Belize, Guatemala, Peru
 Catoferia chiapensis A.Gray ex Benth. - Chiapas, Guatemala, El Salvador, Honduras
 Catoferia martinezii Ramamoorthy - Guerrero
 Catoferia spicata (Benth.) Benth. - Colombia, Peru

Main characteristics
The shrub can usually be identified by its flower's exaggerated, protruding stamens and very large, circular sepals (the outer layer surrounding the petal). Petals belonging to plants of this genome typically curve inwards, the species are very similar to the genus Orthosiphon. Shrubs in this group are  usually 0.5 and 2 meters tall, with a stem thickness of approximately 3mm. They may also carry spikes ranging from 1.5 to 5.5 centimeters.

References

Lamiaceae
Lamiaceae genera